Pars pro toto, is a figure of speech where the name of a portion of an object, place, or concept is used or taken to represent its entirety. It is distinct from a merism, which is a reference to a whole by an enumeration of parts; metonymy, where an object, place, or concept is called by something or some place associated with it; or synecdoche, which can refer both to pars pro toto and its inverse: the whole representing a part.

In the context of language, pars pro toto means that something is named after a part or subset of it, or after a limited characteristic, which in itself is not necessarily representative of the whole. For example, "glasses" is a pars pro toto name for something that consists of more than literally just two pieces of glass (the frame, nosebridge, temples, etc. as well as the lenses). Pars pro toto usage is especially common in political geography, with examples including "Russia" or "Russians", used to refer to the entire former Russian Empire or former Soviet Union or its people; "Holland" for the Netherlands; and, particularly in languages other than English, using the translation of "England" in that language to refer to Great Britain or the United Kingdom. Among English-speakers, "Britain" is a common pars pro toto shorthand for the United Kingdom. "Schweiz", Switzerland's name in German, comes from its central canton of Schwyz.

The inverse of a pars pro toto is a totum pro parte, in which the whole is used to describe a part. The term synecdoche is used for both.

Geography 

An example of a pars pro toto in geography is the use of the capital to refer generally to the country such as Washington for the United States, Beijing for China, Moscow for Russia, Berlin for Germany, Tokyo for Japan, Paris for France, London for the United Kingdom, Rome for Italy, etc. When the capital is used to refer specifically to the country's government, the figure of speech is a metonymy rather than a pars pro toto.

Certain place names are sometimes used as synecdoches to denote an area greater than that warranted by their strict meaning:
 "Antigua" for Antigua and Barbuda
 "Austria" for the former Austro-Hungarian Empire or the Habsburg-ruled lands
 "Baghdad" for Iraq
 "The Balkans" to include historically related parts of southeastern Europe as well as the Balkan Peninsula, or for the countries that made up the former Yugoslavia
 "Bohemia" for the former Czech lands, now the Czech Republic 
 "Bosnia" for Bosnia and Herzegovina
 "Denmark" for the erstwhile Kingdom of Denmark–Norway
 "England" for Great Britain or the United Kingdom
 "Great Britain" or simply "Britain" for the United Kingdom especially when excluding Northern Ireland
 "Holland" for the Netherlands – see Netherlands (terminology)
 Jawadwipa (Java), Swarnadwipa (Sumatra), and Sunda Islands (Java, Sumatra, Kalimantan, Bali, East & West Nusa Tenggara), for Indonesia (all of those and Papua & Maluku Islands)
 Java, for the main island and the surrounding islands (Madura, Thousand Islands, and hundred others) under the jurisdiction of the 6 provinces in Indonesia
 Sumatra, for the main island and the surrounding islands (Nias, Bangka, Belitung, etc.)
 Kalimantan, Sulawesi, Papua, for the main islands and the surrounding islands
 "Monte Carlo" for Monaco
 "Muscovy" for Russia
 "Naples" for the former Kingdom of the Two Sicilies
 "Newfoundland" for what is now called Newfoundland and Labrador
 "Patagonia" for southern Chile and Argentina (sometimes mistaken for both countries)
 "Peru" for the former Inca Empire and the Viceroyalty or Kingdom of Peru
 "Piedmont" or "Sardinia" for the former Kingdom of Sardinia
 "Poland" for the former Polish–Lithuanian Commonwealth
 "Prussia" for the former German Empire
 "Russia" (or "Soviet Russia") for the former Soviet Union
 "Saint Helena" for Saint Helena, Ascension, and Tristan da Cunha
 "Saint Vincent" for Saint Vincent and the Grenadines
 "Santo Domingo" for the Dominican Republic
 "São Tomé" for São Tomé and Príncipe
 "Scandinavia" for the Nordic countries or Fennoscandia
 "Serbia" for the former Serbia and Montenegro (made up of today's Serbia, Montenegro, and Kosovo)
 "South America" for the partially overlapping concept of Latin America
 "South Pole" for Antarctica
 "Sweden" for the former Sweden-Norway
 "Tahiti" for French Polynesia
 "Taiwan" for the (Free area of the) Republic of China, which consists of Penghu, Kinmen,  Matsu, and the island of Taiwan
 "Tel Aviv" for Tel Aviv - Yafo
 "Trinidad" for Trinidad and Tobago
 "Turkey" for the former Ottoman Empire

Other examples
Individual body parts are often colloquially used to refer to an entire body; examples include:
 "skin" or "hide" ("save your skin" or "skin in the game" or "the teacher will have my hide")
 "mouth" ("mouth to feed")
 "head" ("head count")
 "face" ("famous faces")
 "hand" ("all hands on deck")
 "hand" for a person, usually a woman, being considered as a marital partner, as in the phrase "he asked her father for her hand in marriage"
 "eyeballs" (television audience)
 "guts" (to "hate someone's guts")
 "back", used to mean the entire human body in relation to clothing ("shirt off my back")
 "back" or "neck", used to mean a person's entire self in relation to being bothered ("get off my back" or "we'll have the police on our necks"
 "brain" for intelligence or a smart person, as in "the class brain" or "the brains of the operation" or "where's your brain"
 "back" or "neck", used to mean a person's whole self or physical being or physical life, as in the sayings "to have someone's back" or "save one's neck"
 "butt" or "ass", used to indicate a person's entire self or body ("get your butt on a plane" or "the boss fired my ass")

The names of affiliates or subdivisions of large corporations are sometimes used to refer to the entire corporation:
 Chevrolet, Holden (in Oceania), or Opel (in Europe) to represent the entirety of General Motors, where using the most common GM brand in each region represents the entirety of General Motors
 Activision or Blizzard to refer to holding parent company Activision Blizzard

Regional demonyms are sometimes used to refer to a whole people or ethnic group:
 "Yankee" is used, especially outside of the United States, to refer to Americans in general (despite the original meaning of the word being of a inhabitant of New England)

Other examples include an individual object being used to refer to a larger object or group of which it is a part:
 "bread" for food in general, as in "my job puts bread in my children's mouths"
 "pork bellies" for commodities to be traded
 "head" for counting individual farm animals (e.g. "twelve head of cattle" for "twelve cows, bulls, etc.")
 "Big Ben" for Elizabeth Tower
 "motor" for automobile (as in the corporation General Motors or the word "Motors" used in the name of a car dealership)
 similarly, "wheels" for automobile, "jet" for jet(-propelled) airplane, "sail" for sailing ship
 "gun", used to refer to the shooter as well as his firearm (e.g., "he was a hired gun")
 "body" for a whole person, as in the words, "somebody", "anybody", "everybody", "nobody" or "a body", as in "can't a body have some peace and quiet?"
 "soul", meaning a whole person, as "don't tell a soul"

See also 
 Metonymy
 Synecdoche
 Totum pro parte
 Geographical renaming

References 

Figures of speech
Latin words and phrases
Rhetoric
Synecdoche